Glyphipterix delta is a species of sedge moth in the genus Glyphipterix. It was described by Sigeru Moriuti and Tosihisa Saito in 1964. It is found in Honshu, Japan.

The wingspan is about 9 mm.

References

Moths described in 1964
Glyphipterigidae
Moths of Japan